Egobunma Kelechi Nwodim (born March 10, 1988) is a Nigerian-American actress, comedian, writer, and singer. Nwodim has been a cast member on the NBC sketch comedy series Saturday Night Live since 2018, beginning with the show's 44th season.

Life and career
In 2006, Nwodim, who is of Nigerian heritage, graduated from Eastern Technical High School in Essex, Maryland, in Baltimore County. She received a biology degree from University of Southern California. Deciding to pursue a career in comedy, she began taking classes at the Upright Citizens Brigade Theatre (UCB) in Los Angeles. Until joining SNL, Nwodim was a regular cast member at UCB, where she also performed her one-woman show Great Black Women...and Then There's Me.

Nwodim was named one of the New Faces at the 2016 Just for Laughs festival. Also that year, she performed at the CBS Diversity Showcase. Supporting roles on television for Nwodim include Law & Order True Crime: The Menendez Murders (a three-episode arc in 2017), 2 Broke Girls, and Living Biblically. Impersonating Maya Angelou, Nwodim roasted various celebrities and companies in a 2017 Funny or Die sketch. Nwodim has made several guest appearances on podcasts such as Comedy Bang! Bang! and Spontaneanation.

Nwodim's addition to the cast of Saturday Night Live, a long-running NBC sketch-comedy show, as a featured player was announced on September 21, 2018. On September 8, 2020, Nwodim was promoted to a repertory player ahead of the forty-sixth season of Saturday Night Live.

Filmography

Film

Television

References

External links

Upright Citizens Brigade page

American people of Nigerian descent
American sketch comedians
American women comedians
Actresses from Baltimore
Comedians from Maryland
Living people
21st-century American actresses
21st-century American comedians
1988 births
American film actresses
American television actresses
American voice actresses
Upright Citizens Brigade Theater performers
University of Southern California alumni
African-American actresses
African-American female comedians
21st-century African-American women
21st-century African-American people
20th-century African-American people
20th-century African-American women